Kamakhya, A Socio-Cultural Study is a comprehensive book on the Kamakhya temple complex in Guwahati, Assam. The book is authored by Nihar Ranjan Mishra and published by D. K. Printworld Pvt Ltd in 2004. The book makes a detailed study of the temple rituals, festivals and personnel and socio-cultural life and includes an account on spread of Saktism in the region.

References

External links

2005 non-fiction books
Indian non-fiction books
Assamese literature
Books from Assam
History books about India
21st-century Indian books